The 9th Filmfare Awards were held on 20 May 1962, at Bombay, honoring the best films in Hindi Cinema in 1961.

Jis Desh Men Ganga Behti Hai led the ceremony with 10 nominations, followed by Gunga Jumna with 7 nominations.

Jis Desh Mein Ganga Behti Hai was a 1960 release, but was not considered for the 8th Filmfare Awards. 

Jis Desh Men Ganga Behti Hai won 4 awards, including Best Film and Best Actor (for Manoj Kumar), thus becoming the most-awarded film at the ceremony. 

Shubha Khote received dual nominations for Best Supporting Actress for her performances in Gharana and Sasural, but lost to Nirupa Roy who won the award for Chhaya.

Main awards

Technical Awards

Multiple nominations and wins

The following films received multiple awards and nominations.

See also
8th Filmfare Awards
10th Filmfare Awards

References

External links
 Winner and nomination of 9th Filmfare Awards at Internet Movie Database

Filmfare Awards
Filmfare
1962 in Indian cinema